Brian Dabul was the defending champion, but he chose to not participate this year.
Horacio Zeballos defeated Thiago Alves 6–7(4), 6–4, 6–3 in the final.

Seeds

Draw

Final four

Top half

Bottom half

References
 Main Draw
 Qualifying Draw

Credicard Citi MasterCard Tennis Cup - Singles
MasterCard Tennis Cup
Mast